Nabam Tatang (born 10 July 1997) is an Indian cricketer. He made his Twenty20 debut on 17 January 2021, for Arunachal Pradesh in the 2020–21 Syed Mushtaq Ali Trophy.

References

External links
 

1997 births
Living people
Indian cricketers
Arunachal Pradesh cricketers
Place of birth missing (living people)